Johannes Enschedé Jr. (16 November 1750 in Haarlem – 29 July 1799 in Haarlem) was a Haarlem regent and collector.

Biography
He was the grandson of the founder of the Joh. Enschedé company, and one of the first members of the Dutch Society of Science and the Teylers Second Society. He was a regent of the St. Elizabeth's-Gasthuis and the Hofje van Staats en Noblet. Johannes was the son of Johannes Enschedé (1708-1780) and the brother of Jacobus and Abraham. He married Johanna Elisabeth Swaving and was the father of Johannes Enschedé III and Christiaan Justus (the father of Adriaan Justus Enschedé).

His father was a collector of Costeriana and had statues of Coster and Hadrianus Junius, Coster's biographer, placed in the garden of his home, adjacent to the typesetter's workshop in 1768. An engraving by Cornelis van Noorde shows the workshop and the statues. Enschedé Jr. continued his father's collection of Costeriana and also added his love of Greek and Latin books.  He died relatively young, and his wife succeeded him in his role leading the company. Under her influence the day-to-day operations were split into three divisions; the newspaper, the type foundry, and the bible publishing. This "triumvirate" lasted three generations.

References

 Enschede aan het Klokhuisplein, (Dutch), by Just Enschede, De Vrieseborch, Haarlem, 1991, 

Members of Teylers Tweede Genootschap
1750 births
1799 deaths
People from Haarlem
18th-century Dutch businesspeople
Joh. Enschedé